Nepalomyia is a genus of flies in the family Dolichopodidae.

Species
Species in the genus include:

Nepalomyia aridita Wei & Yang, 2007
Nepalomyia baliensis Yang, Saigusa & Masunaga, 2004
Nepalomyia beijingensis Wang & Yang, 2005
Nepalomyia bidentata (Yang & Saigusa, 2001)
Nepalomyia biseta Wang, Yang & Grootaert, 2007
Nepalomyia brevifurcata (Yang & Saigusa, 2001)
Nepalomyia chalajae Negrobov, Selivanova and Maslova, 2018
Nepalomyia chinensis (Yang, 2001)
Nepalomyia confusa Hollis, 1964
Nepalomyia crassata (Yang & Saigusa, 2001)
Nepalomyia daliensis (Yang & Saigusa, 2001)
Nepalomyia damingshanus Wang, Chen & Yang, 2014
Nepalomyia daweishana (Yang & Saigusa, 2001)
Nepalomyia dentata (Yang & Saigusa, 2001)
Nepalomyia dilaticosta Runyon & Hurley, 2003
Nepalomyia dongae Wang, Chen & Yang, 2014
Nepalomyia dytei Hollis, 1964
Nepalomyia effecta (Wei, 2006)
Nepalomyia emeiensis Wang, Yang & Grootaert, 2007
Nepalomyia fanjingensis (Wei, 2006)
Nepalomyia flava (Yang & Saigusa, 2001)
Nepalomyia fogangensis Wang, Yang & Grootaert, 2009
Nepalomyia furcata (Yang & Saigusa, 2001)
Nepalomyia guangdongensis Wang, Yang & Grootaert, 2009
Nepalomyia guangxiensis Zhang & Yang, 2005
Nepalomyia harpago Grootaert, 2013
Nepalomyia hastata Wang, Yang & Grootaert, 2009
Nepalomyia henanensis (Yang, Yang & Li, 1998)
Nepalomyia henotica (Wei, 2006)
Nepalomyia hesperia Runyon & Hurley, 2003
Nepalomyia hiantula (Wei, 2006)
Nepalomyia horvati Wang & Yang, 2004
Nepalomyia hui Yang & Wang, 2006
Nepalomyia igori Negrobov, Selivanova and Maslova, 2018
Nepalomyia kotrbae Grichanov, 2010
Nepalomyia liui Wang, Yang & Grootaert, 2007
Nepalomyia longa (Yang & Saigusa, 2001)
Nepalomyia longiseta (Yang & Saigusa, 2000)
Nepalomyia lustrabilis (Wei, 2006)
Nepalomyia luteipleurata (Yang & Saigusa, 2001)
Nepalomyia nantouensis Wang, Yang & Masunaga, 2007
Nepalomyia negrobovi Grootaert, 2013
Nepalomyia nepalensis (Yang, Saigusa & Masunaga, 2003)
Nepalomyia nigra (Yang, Saigusa & Masunaga, 2003)
Nepalomyia nigricornis (Van Duzee, 1914)
Nepalomyia orientalis (Yang & Li, 1998)
Nepalomyia pallipes (Yang & Saigusa, 2000)
Nepalomyia pallipilosa (Yang & Saigusa, 2001)
Nepalomyia pilifera (Yang & Saigusa, 2001)
Nepalomyia pingbiana (Yang & Saigusa, 2001)
Nepalomyia priapus Grootaert, 2013
Nepalomyia qiana Wei & Yang, 2007
Nepalomyia reunionensis Grichanov, 2010
Nepalomyia ruiliensis Wang & Yang, 2005
Nepalomyia shennonjiaensis Wang, Chen & Yang, 2014
Nepalomyia sichuanensis Wang, Yang & Grootaert, 2007
Nepalomyia singaporensis Grootaert, 2013
Nepalomyia siveci Wang & Yang, 2004
Nepalomyia sombrea (Harmston & Knowlton, 1945)
Nepalomyia spinata Grootaert, 2013
Nepalomyia spiniformis Zhang & Yang, 2005
Nepalomyia taiwanensis Wang & Yang, 2004
Nepalomyia tatjanae (Negrobov, 1984)
Nepalomyia temasek Grootaert, 2013
Nepalomyia tianlinensis Zhang & Yang, 2005
Nepalomyia tianmushana (Yang, 2001)
Nepalomyia trifurcata (Yang & Saigusa, 2000)
Nepalomyia tuberculosa (Yang & Saigusa, 2001)
Nepalomyia ventralis Wang, Yang & Grootaert, 2007
Nepalomyia xiaoyanae Wang, Chen & Yang, 2013
Nepalomyia xui Wang, Yang & Grootaert, 2009
Nepalomyia yangi Wang, Yang & Grootaert, 2007
Nepalomyia yunnanensis (Yang & Saigusa, 2001)
Nepalomyia zhangae Wang, Yang & Grootaert, 2009
Nepalomyia zengchengensis Wang, Yang & Grootaert, 2007
Nepalomyia zhouzhiensis (Yang & Saigusa, 2001)

Species moved to other genera:
Nepalomyia jinshanensis Wang, Yang & Grootaert, 2009: moved to Micromorphus

References 

Dolichopodidae genera
Peloropeodinae
Diptera of Asia
Diptera of Africa
Diptera of North America
Diptera of Europe